Ankit Bhardwaj  is an Indian film and television actor. He made his debut with the Hollywood Movie Desires of the Heart (2013 film) as Gopal from India. Later he had done a grey shade role of "Krishna" in movie "Gram post Bharat" by Vijay Singh.

He had started his career in Indian television industry with Zee TV series Sapne Suhane Ladakpan Ke in which he played the role of Vachan Singh. Later he also played as Viren in the love drama series O Gujariya: Badlein Chal Duniya featured on Channel V. He has also performed the role of Sanjay in Colors channel popular show Thapki Pyaar Ki  and role of Chandrasen - Prince of Marwar in Sony Entertainment Television's show  Bharat Ka Veer Putra – Maharana Pratap.

He has also played the lead role in movie based on Patel Andolan for Reservation Humein Haq Chahiye...Haq Se, where his character is inspired from Hardik Patel the leader of patidar andolan.

Ankit was also cast as the lead actor in the music video Mezbaan Zindagi released by Zee Music Company in 2018 

In 2018 he was featured in Indian Hindi horror anthology television series Kaun Hai?

During start of 2019, he had featured in Zee TV popular show Rajaa Betaa and now in mid 2019 he had reappeared on the show bringing a dramatic twist with his comeback.

Ankit Bhardwaj is Featuring in starplus popular show Rajjo (TV series) as Mukund.

Early life
Ankit was born in Jaipur. He did his schooling from S.S. Jain Subodh Senior Secondary School and later pursued a degree in animation and multimedia film making from Birla Institute of Technology, Mesra Jaipur Campus. During his studies he participated in various cultural programs like dancing, acting and modelling. He had won many awards in School and College. Post studies he went to Mumbai and started assisting in direction in a daily soap of Reliance Big Magic and started giving auditions for different roles. Later he was selected for movie Desires of the Heart (2013 film).

His family includes his father who is a businessman in Jaipur, mother who is a housewife and elder brother who is an interior designer.

Career

He has started his acting career from theater he was doing theater from his school and college days at Ravindra Manch in Jaipur Rajasthan. After film making course he moved to Mumbai for assisting in direction. He assisted in many TV shows and act in many short films. After giving many auditions he appeared in the English independent film Desires of the Heart as Gopal. He continued in theater during this period and was a member of Nadira Babbar's Ekjute theatre group. Simultaneously he auditioned for Vijay singh movie. Gram post Bharat in which he got a grey shade character as Krishna. Then he moved towards Indian television industry he did Sapne Suhane Ladakpan Ke as Vachan singh, O Gujariya: Badlein Chal Duniya on Channel V as Viren. He had also worked in Colors channel show Thapki Pyaar Ki as Sanjay and as Chandrasen - Prince of Marwar in Sony Entertainment Television's show  Bharat Ka Veer Putra – Maharana Pratap.

He recently completed his another movie Humein Haq Chahiye...Haq Se. 
In this film he has played the character of a young guy who is the leader to the Reservation movement for Patidars in Gujarat. The movie is based on Patidar Andolan and his role is inspired of Hardik Patel.

His latest movie released was Baazi Zindagi Ki by Linkway Films International in which he has played the lead role.

He has acted in the music video Mezbaan Zindagi released by Zee Music Company in 2018 

In August 2018, he has played role in Colors Horror TV series Kaun Hai?.

During start of 2019, he had featured in Zee TV show Rajaa Betaa where he was playing character Rahul who went missing from his marriage leaving Poorva clueless about her life. Now when things are getting settled in Poorva's life after Vedant have accepted Poorva and her child, in a dramatic twist Ankit has now returned on the show as Rahul in mid 2019.

Filmography

Television

Films

Web series

References

  

1991 births
Living people
Indian male television actors
21st-century Indian male actors
Indian male soap opera actors
Male actors from Jaipur
Male actors in Hindi television